Samuel Fallows (December 13, 1835September 5, 1922) was an English American immigrant, minister, lecturer, and author. He was the 9th Superintendent of Public Instruction of Wisconsin and served as Presiding Bishop of the Reformed Episcopal Church for 30 years between 1877 and 1922.  During the American Civil War he served as a chaplain and later as an officer in the Union Army, receiving an honorary brevet to Brigadier General after the war.

Early life
Fallows was born in Pendleton, Greater Manchester, in England, and emigrated to the Wisconsin Territory as a child in 1848. His family settled at Marshall (then called "Bird's Ruins") in eastern Dane County, and established a farm. He worked as a farm hand to pay for school, becoming a Methodist minister in 1858 and graduating from the University of Wisconsin (now University of Wisconsin–Madison) in 1859. He was elected Vice-President and principal of Galesburg University and served there for two years, then became minister of the Methodist Episcopal Church in Oshkosh, Wisconsin.

Civil War service

32nd Wisconsin Volunteers
Fallows was ministering to the Oshkosh church at the time of the outbreak of the American Civil War and did not volunteer in the first year of the war. In 1862, however, he resigned his ministry and enlisted for service in the Union Army, becoming chaplain of the 32nd Wisconsin Infantry Regiment under Colonel James Henry Howe.  He served for a year with the regiment which mostly performed guard duty during that time to protect supplies and logistics along the Mississippi River in the Western Theater of the American Civil War.  He resigned due to poor health on June 29, 1863.

40th Wisconsin Volunteers
He returned to his ministry in Wisconsin, this time at Appleton, Wisconsin, and was also elected professor of natural science at Lawrence University, in Appleton.  As his health recovered, so to did his fervor to fight for the Union, and, in early 1864, he helped to raise a number of volunteers for the 40th Wisconsin Infantry Regiment—called the "Normal Regiment" due to the large number of teachers and students in the unit—and was selected as the regiment's lieutenant colonel.  The regiment was assigned mostly to the defense of Memphis, Tennessee, and was engaged in the defense of Memphis during the raid known as the Second Battle of Memphis, carried out by Confederate cavalry under General Nathan Bedford Forrest on August 21, 1864.

49th Wisconsin Volunteers
In January 1865, Lt. Colonel Fallows was promoted to colonel and appointed to the organization of a new regiment in Madison, Wisconsin, which became the 49th Wisconsin Infantry Regiment.  The 49th Wisconsin mustered into service on March 8, 1865, and proceeded to St. Louis and then to Rolla, Missouri, where they engaged in guard duty through the end of the war.  Colonel Fallows mustered out November 1, 1865.

Brevet to brigadier general
On January 13, 1866, U.S. President Andrew Johnson nominated Colonel Fallows for a brevet to brigadier general of volunteers in recognition for his service.  The United States Senate confirmed the brevet on March 12, 1866, and the rank was made effective retroactive to October 24, 1865.

Postbellum years

Colonel Fallows returned to his ministry after the war and was a pastor for two of the largest churches in Milwaukee, including three years (1865–1868) as pastor of Summerfield United Methodist Church. In 1866, Fallows was appointed to the University of Wisconsin Board of Regents by Governor Lucius Fairchild, serving until 1874.  In 1870, when the State Superintendent of Public Instruction Alexander J. Craig died in office, Fairchild appointed Fallows to fill that position.  Fallows was subsequently elected in a special election for the remainder of the term in 1870 and re-elected to a full term in 1871, leaving office in January 1874.  While serving as Superintendent, Fallows earned his Doctorate of Divinity (D.D.) from Lawrence University in Appleton.  Throughout his postwar career, he was a public figure notable for his efforts in public education, prison reform, labor rights, and the temperance movement.

In 1874, he moved to Bloomington, Illinois, and was appointed President of Illinois Wesleyan University. The following year he joined the newly organized Reformed Episcopal Church and moved to Chicago, where he became Rector of St. Paul's Reformed Episcopal Church.  In 1876, he became editor of the Appeal, the magazine of the church, and later that year, on July 15, he was elected Presiding Bishop of the new church. He subsequently served in that role for 30 of the next 50 years.

After his service in the war, Colonel Fallows became a companion of the Illinois Commandery of the Military Order of the Loyal Legion of the United States and was the chaplain of the Grand Army of the Republic.  He also served as chaplain at the dedication of the Lincoln Memorial in Washington, D.C., just months before his own death in 1922.

Fallows died after a bad case of influenza at his home in Chicago on September 5, 1922, with his daughter Alice at his bedside.  He was cremated and his remains were sent to Massachusetts to be interred alongside his wife, Lucy, who had died in 1916.  A memorial was erected to Fallows and his wife at Forest Home Cemetery, in Forest Park, Illinois.  At the time of his death, he was the oldest living alumni of the University of Wisconsin.

Personal life and family
In 1860, Reverend Fallows married Lucy Bethia Huntington, a niece of Reverend Frederic Dan Huntington, of Massachusetts.  Lucy died in 1916.  They had at least four children together:
 Edward Huntington Fallows, an attorney who lived in New York
 Major Charles Samuel Fallows, lawyer, Saratoga, California
 Mrs. Helen Mayer Williams of San Francisco
 Alice Katherine Fallows

Electoral history

| colspan="6" style="text-align:center;background-color: #e9e9e9;"| General Election, November 8, 1870

| colspan="6" style="text-align:center;background-color: #e9e9e9;"| General Election, November 7, 1871

See also

List of bishops of the Reformed Episcopal Church

References

Notes

Further reading

External links
 
 

|-

1835 births
1922 deaths
University of Wisconsin–Madison alumni
Writers from Wisconsin
Educators from Wisconsin
Religious leaders from Wisconsin
English Methodists
19th-century American Methodist ministers
American Reformed Episcopalians
People of Wisconsin in the American Civil War
Union Army colonels
Burials at Forest Home Cemetery, Chicago
Bishops of the Reformed Episcopal Church
Superintendents of Public Instruction of Wisconsin
People from Pendleton, Greater Manchester
Members of the Methodist Episcopal Church
Grand Army of the Republic officials
Methodists from Wisconsin